This is a list of rivers in South Africa.

It is quite common to find the Afrikaans word -rivier as part of the name. Another common suffix is "-kamma", from the Khoisan term for "river"
(often tautologically the English term "river" is added to the name). The Zulu word amanzi (water) also forms part of some river names.

The Afrikaans term spruit (compare spring) often labels small rivers.

List

 A  Drainage basin code assigned by the Department of Water Affairs (South Africa), a complete list is available at Drainage basins of South Africa

Gallery

See also

 List of reservoirs and dams in South Africa
 Water Management Areas
 Estuaries in South Africa
 List of lakes in South Africa
 Lagoons of South Africa
 List of Bays of South Africa
 Drainage basins of South Africa

References

  Dep. of Water Affairs; Republic of South Africa

External links

 Hydrology
 Map where one can zoom into a drainage system
 GIS data and map of all rivers of South Africa
FROC - Reference frequency of occurrence of fish species in South Africa

South Africa
Rivers